The Hospice Comtesse or Hospice Notre-Dame is a 17th-century hospice on Rue de la Monnaie in the Old Town area of Lille, France, first built in 1236 by Joan, Countess of Flanders.  It is now a museum on the history of the hospice.

The museum's collections include ceramics, paintings and furniture.

References 

History of Lille
Buildings and structures in Lille
1236 establishments in Europe
1230s establishments in France
Local museums in France
13th century in France
Medieval French architecture
Museums in Nord (French department)
Tourist attractions in Lille